Simone Trimboli (born 19 April 2002) is an Italian professional footballer who plays as a midfielder for Sampdoria.

Career

Sampdoria
Trimboli joined the youth academy of Sampdoria in 2010, and worked his way up their youth categories. He captained their U18s for the 2019–20 season. On 8 October 2021, he signed a professional contract with the club, keeping him until June 2024. He made his professional debut with Sampdoria in a 3–1 Serie A loss to Juventus on 12 March 2022.

Ferencváros (loan)
On 14 February 2023, he was loaned for the remaining part of the 2022-23 Nemzeti Bajnokság I season  to Ferencváros.

International career
Trimboli is a youth international for Italy, having represented the Italy U15s, U16s, and U17s.

References

External links
 
 Sampdoria Profile
 FIGC U15 Profile
 FIGC U16 Profile
 FIGC U17 Profile

2002 births
Living people
People from Lavagna
Italian footballers
Italy youth international footballers
U.C. Sampdoria players
Serie A players
Association football midfielders
Sportspeople from the Province of Genoa
Footballers from Liguria
21st-century Italian people